Perseverance Records is a record label which releases film scores on CD and online.  Releases are usually accompanied by extensive booklets. Extras, such as audio interviews with composers, are also sometimes included.

Discography 

No Passport Control (PRD 107) by Sharat Chandra Srivastava (digital release only)
Forsaken Themes From Fantastic Films, Vol. 1: Tears in Rain (PRD 106) by Various Artists
Shredder (PRD 105D) by Alan Derian (digital release only)
Flannery (PRD 104D) by Miriam Cutler (digital release only)
Til Kingdom Come (PRD 103D) by Miriam Cutler (digital release only)
No Passport Control (PRD 102-1) by Sharat Chandra Srivastava featuring Katja Koren (digital single)
The Matrix Symphony (PRD 101) by Don Davis
Amundsen (PRD 100) by Johan Söderqvist
Solis (PRD 099) by David Stone Hamilton
Prom Night (PRD 098) by Paul Zaza & Carl Zittrer (first officially licensed soundtrack album, not to be confused with the bootleg)
The Way You Move Me (PRDI 097) by Stanley Butler
Awaken (PRD 095) by Brian Ralston & Kays Al-Atrakchi
Fright Night (PRD 094) by Various Artists
Bruiser/ Blender (PRD 093D) by Donald Rubinstein (digital release only)
Castle Freak (PRD 092) by Richard Band
Rough Magic (PRD 091) by Craig Safan
Reunion (PRD 090) by The Dennis Dreith Band
Cinemusica (PRD 089/ LM2010-1) by Mader
Nemesis (PRD 088) by Michel Rubini
Standard Delivery (PRD 087/ PRJV 4242) by Eric Ekstrand
It's About Time (PRD 086/ HMR-9103) by Don Peake
Knight Rider, Vol. 7 (PRD 085) by Don Peake (Vols 4-7 are USB cards loaded with 2 episodic scores in wav and mp3 format)
Knight Rider, Vol. 6 (PRD 084) by Don Peake
Knight Rider, Vol. 5 (PRD 083) by Don Peake
Knight Rider, Vol. 4 (PRD 082) by Don Peake
Trophy Heads (PRD 081) by Richard Band
At Middleton (PRD 080) by Arturo Sandoval 
Eternamente Manzanero (PRD 079) by Arturo Sandoval and Jorge Calandrelli 
Embrace Me (PRD 078) by Antonia Bennett
The March (PRD 077) by Tandis Jenhudson
Kickboxer - The 2014 Deluxe Edition (PRD 076) by Paul Hertzog
Flash Gordon, Volume 3 (PRD 075) by Michael Picton
Flash Gordon, Volume 2 (PRD 074) by Michael Picton
Ethel (PRD 073) by Miriam Cutler
The Pit and the Pendulum (PRD 072) by Richard Band
Private Dancer (PRD 071) by Brian Ralston
Dawn Imagined (PRD 070) by Donald Rubinstein (music based on the original 1977 sketches for the planned score to Dawn of the Dead)
Flash Gordon, Volume 1 (PRD 069) by Michael Picton
Best of Silent Hill (PRD 068) by Akira Yamaoka
American Revolutionary: The Evolution of Grace Lee Boggs (PRD 067) by Vivek Maddala
Thief (PRR 066) by Tangerine Dream and Craig Safan
Crooked Arrows (PRD 065) by Brian Ralston
Krush Groove (PRR 064) by various artists
Lesser Known Favorites (PRP-CS-03) by Craig Safan
Chitty Chitty Bang Bang (PRR 063) by Richard M. Sherman and Robert B. Sherman (2 CD)
Creep Van (PRD 062) by Dennis Dreith
Gregory Crewdson: Brief Encounters (PRD 061) by Dana Kaproff
Los Angeles, 1937 (PRD 060) by Phillip Lambro (unused score from Chinatown)
Pennies from Heaven (PRD 059) by various artists
Escape (PRD 058) by Edwin Wendler
The Exorcist (PRD 057) by various artists
Morricone.Uncovered (PRD 056) by Ennio Morricone & Romina Arena
Music from the Edge (PRD 055) by John Corigliano (unused score from Edge of Darkness)
Three Amigos! (PRD 054) by Elmer Bernstein & Randy Newman
Charmed (PRD 053) by J. Peter Robinson (2 CD) (canceled) 
Battle of the Bulge (PRD 052) by Benjamin Frankel
Capricorn One (PRD 051) by Jerry Goldsmith
The Witches of Eastwick (PRD 050) by John Williams
Seeking Justice (PRP-JPR-02) by J. Peter Robinson
Lilies of the Field (PRR 049) by Jerry Goldsmith
Wake Wood (PRD 048) by Michael Convertino (canceled)
Nowhere to Run (PRD 047) by Mark Isham
The Wedding Banquet (PRD 046) by Mader
Animals United (PRD 045) by David Newman (US version of Konferenz der Tiere)
Circus (PRD 044) by Craig Safan (act music from the 141st Ringling Bros. and Barnum & Bailey Circus show)
The Gauntlet (PRR 043) by Jerry Fielding
Exorcist II: The Heretic (PRR 042) by Ennio Morricone
Cinemusica (LM2010-1) by Mader
Lord of Illusions (2 CDs) (PRD 041) by Simon Boswell
The Secret Adventures of Jules Verne (2000 TV series) (2 CDs) (PRD 040) by Nick Glennie-Smith
Slipstream (PRD 039) by Elmer Bernstein
Death Warrant (PRD 038) by Gary Chang
Rain Man (PRD 037) by Hans Zimmer
Jason and the Argonauts (2000 Mini-Series) (PRD 036) by Simon Boswell
Red Sonja (PRD 035) by Ennio Morricone
No Retreat, No Surrender (PRD 034) by Frank Harris
Puppet Master – The Soundtrack Collection Box (5 CDs) (PRD 033) by Richard Band, Jeff Walton, John Massari, and Peter Bernstein; contains music from Puppet Master, Puppet Master II, Puppet Master III, Puppet Master 4, Curse of the Puppet Master, Retro Puppet Master, Puppet Master vs. Demonic Toys, and Puppet Master: Axis of Evil
Unforgettable (PRD 032) by Christopher Young
Fade To Black (Promotional CD: PP-CS-01) by Craig Safan
The Believers (PRD 031) by J. Peter Robinson
Journey To The End Of The Night (PRD 030) by Elia Cmiral
The Runestone (PRD 029) by David Newman
George A. Romero's Knightriders (PRD 028) by Donald Rubinstein 
Hired Guns (PRD 027) by The Sales Bros. (Hunt Sales & Tony Sales) (This is Perseverance's only non-soundtrack release to date.)
The Deaths Of Ian Stone (PRD 026) by Elia Cmiral
The Interior (PRDI 025 - Online Exclusive) by Edwin Wendler
Mutant - Expanded Original Motion Picture Score (PRD 024) by Richard Band
The Film Music of Jim Manzie, Volume 2 (PRP 023) by Jim Manzie
The Film Music of Jim Manzie, Volume 1 (PRP 022) by Jim Manzie
The Film Music of Phillip Lambro (PRD 021) by Phillip Lambro
Bloodsport (PRD 020) by Paul Hertzog
Martin / Pollock (Unused Score) (PRD 019) by Donald Rubinstein
Deadly Friend (PRD-LCSE-018) by Charles Bernstein
Leatherface: The Texas Chainsaw Massacre III (PRD-LCSE-017) by Jim Manzie
Kickboxer (PRD 016) by Paul Hertzog
The Prophecy II (PRD 015) by David C. Williams
Murph The Surf (PRD 014) by Phillip Lambro
The Prophecy (PRD 013) by David C. Williams
Dark Skies (PRD 012) by Michael Hoenig and Mark Snow
Gag (PRD 011) by Dennis Dreith
Remo Williams: The Adventure Begins (PRD 010) by Craig Safan
Crypt Of The Living Dead (PRD 009) by Phillip Lambro
The Least Worst of Michael Perilstein (PRD 008) by Michael Perilstein
Loch Ness (PRD 007) by Trevor Jones
The Punisher (Stereo: PRD 006, 5.1 SACD: TARAN001) by Dennis Dreith
The Deadly Spawn - Expanded Deadly Deluxe Edition (PRD 005) by Michael Perilstein
The Abominable Dr. Phibes (PRD 004) by Basil Kirchin
Invasion Of The Body Snatchers - 25th Anniversary Edition (PRD 003) by Denny Zeitlin
Dr. Phibes Rises Again - 30th Anniversary Edition (PRD 002) by John Gale
Prince Valiant (PRP 001) by David Bergeaud

External links
 Releases from Perseverance Records
 Perseverance Records credits on Discogs

Record labels established in 2003
American record labels
Reissue record labels